Edward Wood, 1st Earl of Halifax, KG, OM, GCSI, GCMG, GCIE, TD, PC, received numerous honours and awards throughout his career as a British Army officer, statesman and diplomat.

Styles 

16 April 1881 – 8 August 1885: Edward Frederick Lindley Wood
8 August 1885 – 1910: The Hon. Edward Frederick Lindley Wood
1910 – 25 October 1922: The Hon. Edward Frederick Lindley Wood MP
25 October 1922 – 22 December 1925: The Rt. Hon. Edward Frederick Lindley Wood MP
22 December 1925 – 3 April 1926: The Rt. Hon. The 1st Baron Irwin PC
3 April 1926 – 18 April 1931: His Excellency The Rt. Hon. The Lord Irwin PC, Viceroy and Governor-General of India
18 April 1931 – 19 January 1934: The Rt. Hon. The Lord Irwin PC
19 January 1934 – December 1940: The Rt. Hon. The 3rd Viscount Halifax PC
December 1940 – 1944: His Excellency The Rt. Hon. The Viscount Halifax PC, HM Ambassador to the United States of America
1944–1946: His Excellency The Rt. Hon. The 1st Earl of Halifax PC, HM Ambassador to the United States of America
1946–1959: The Rt. Hon. The Earl of Halifax PC

Commonwealth honours

British Empire
 Appointments

Decorations and medals

Non-national titles and honours

Freedom of the City
British Empire
  5 March 1923: Leeds
  1926: Harrogate

Scholastic
 Chancellor, visitor, governor, and fellowships

Honorary degrees

Honorary offices
 Appointments

References

Wood, Edward